Heald is a surname. Notable people with the surname include:

 Anthony Heald (born 1944), American actor
 Brad Heald (born 1983), Australian bass guitarist
Chloe Heald, British TV personality and Playboy model
 Clare Heald (1895–1973), English jockey
 Glen Heald (born 1967), Australian guitarist, songwriter and producer
 Greg Heald (born 1971), English footballer
 Henry Townley Heald (1904–1975), American university president
 John Heald (born 1965), English banker and blogger, cruise director of Carnival Cruise Lines
 Lionel Heald (1897–1981), British barrister and politician
 Mike Heald, American soccer midfielder
 Nathan Heald (1775–1832), American US Army officer
 Oliver Heald (born 1954), British barrister and politician
 Ollie Heald (born 1975), Canadian footballer
 Paul Heald (born 1968), English footballer
 Frederick De Forest Heald (1872-1954), mycologist with the standard author abbreviation "Heald"
 Tim Heald (born 1944), British author, biographer, journalist and public speaker
 William H. Heald (1864–1939), American banker, lawyer and politician
 Paul J. Heald (born 1959), American novelist and law professor

See also
 Heald College, for-profit, business-career college with multiple campuses in the Western United States
 Heald Green, in Greater Manchester, England 
 Heald Island, island east of Walcott Bay, Victoria Land
 Heald Stream Falls, waterfall in Maine, United States
 Heddle, a part of a loom also known as a heald